The Minister of Social Affairs and Employment is the head of the Ministry of Social Affairs and Employment and a member of the Cabinet and the Council of Ministers. The current Minister is Karien van Gennip of the Christian Democratic Appeal (CDA) party who has been in office since 10 January 2022. Regularly a State Secretary is assigned to the Ministry who is tasked with specific portfolios, but not in the current cabinet. In the current cabinet there is also a Minister without Portfolio assigned to the Ministry who is also giving specific portfolios. The current Minister without Portfolio is Carola Schouten of the Christian Union (CU) party who also has been in office since 10 January 2022 and has been assigned the portfolios of Welfare and Pensions and is additionally serving as Third Deputy Prime Minister.

List of Ministers of Social Affairs

List of Ministers of Social Affairs

List of Ministers without Portfolio

List of State Secretaries for Social Affairs

See also
 Ministry of Social Affairs and Employment

References

Social Affairs